George Steers & Co was a 19th century shipyard company at Greenpoint, Long Island, New York.

Company history

Hathorne & Steers

In 1843, George Steers went into partnership with William Hathorne, under the name of Hathorne & Steers, at the foot of North First street, in Williamsburg, Brooklyn. They designed and built several boats including the pilot boat Mary Taylor, with a radical new design in a schooner. The firm was closed in 1849. George then went into partnership with his brothers.

James and George Steers shipyard

In 1850, James Rich Steers and George Steers started the firm George & James R. Steers. inheriting from a naval architecture tradition. The father Henry Steers was already a naval architect in England.  The company was located in Greenpoint, Long Island, New York.

They designed in 1851 the America for John C. Stevens to win the Queen's Cup at the annual regatta of the London Royal Yacht Club. She cost about $23,000.

George Steers died on September 25, 1856. Jack Strickland, supervisor of the construction of the yacht America, was a foreman of the Steers shipyard.

Henry Steers shipyard

In 1857, Henry Steers, the son of James Rich Steers and the grandson of Henry Steers, started his shipyard in Greenpoint, Long Island, New York. He designed and built most of the boats of the Pacific Mail Steamship Company.

List of built ships

by James and George
1849: SS Pacific
1855: SS Niagara
1856: SS Adriatic for Collins Line. (April 7, 1856).S.S. Adriatic.

by Henry Steers
1857: Charles H. Marshall
1859: Hu Quang, Che Kiang and Foh Kein
1865: SS Arizona January 19, 1865
1867: SS Great Republic for Pacific Mail Steamship Company
1869: SS America
1877: Massachusetts for the New York and Providence Line

See also
 List of sailboat designers and manufacturers

References

American shipbuilders
1850 establishments in New York (state)
Greenpoint, Brooklyn